Kellan Grady (born September 11, 1997) is an American professional basketball player for the Grand Rapids Gold of the NBA G League. He played college basketball for the Kentucky Wildcats and the Davidson Wildcats.

Early life and high school career
While growing up, Grady idolized Stephen Curry, following him on his NCAA Tournament run at Davidson and first several seasons with the Golden State Warriors. He briefly met Curry in 2011 and got his picture taken. Grady played three seasons at Catholic Memorial School and was named to the Boston Herald Dream Team. Grady was an all-state performer at Northfield Mount Hermon School, where he transferred after Catholic Memorial. He chose to go to Davidson, turning down offers from several other Atlantic 10 schools and a few Ivy League schools.

College career

In his first college game, Grady hit 7–of–10 3-pointers en route to scoring 23 points in a 110–62 win against Charleston Southern. On November 28, 2017, he had 22 points, five rebounds and two assists against Charlotte. Grady scored a career-high 39 points in a 115–113 triple overtime loss to St. Bonaventure on February 28, 2018. As a freshman, Grady was named Atlantic 10 Rookie of the Year as well as being named to the Second Team All-Atlantic 10. His teammate Peyton Aldridge was named co-player of the year. Grady averaged 18.0 points, 3.3 rebounds, and 1.9 assists per game as a freshman.

Coming into his sophomore season. Grady was named to the Preseason First Team All-Atlantic 10. He suffered a knee injury in December 2018 and missed four games. Grady averaged 17.3 points and 4.5 rebounds per game and helped Davidson claim a berth in the National Invitation Tournament. He was named to the First Team All-Atlantic 10, while teammate Jón Axel Guðmundsson earned player of the year honors. Following the season, Grady declared for the 2019 NBA draft but opted to return to Davidson. 

Grady averaged 17.2 points and 4.2 rebounds per game, but posted 20.6 points per game in February and March. At the close of the regular season in his junior year, Grady was named to the Second Team All-Atlantic 10.

In his senior season, Grady averaged 17.1 points and 4.6 rebounds per game, earning First Team All-Atlantic 10 honors for the second time. He shot 38.2% from 3-point range, the best percentage of his career, and surpassed 2,000 points in an opening round NIT loss. Following the season, Grady announced that he would enter the transfer portal as a graduate student. On March 29, 2021, Grady committed to Kentucky.

Professional career

Grand Rapids Gold (2022–present)
On November 4, 2022, Grady was named to the opening night roster for the Grand Rapids Gold.

Career statistics

College

|-
| style="text-align:left;"| 2017–18
| style="text-align:left;"| Davidson
| 33 || 32 || 35.2 || .501 || .372 || .804 || 3.3 || 1.9 || .8 || .1 || 18.0
|-
| style="text-align:left;"| 2018–19
| style="text-align:left;"| Davidson
| 30 || 30 || 37.6 || .451 || .341 || .735 || 4.5 || 1.9 || 1.0 || .2 || 17.3
|-
| style="text-align:left;"| 2019–20
| style="text-align:left;"| Davidson
| 30 || 29 || 35.8 || .463 || .370 || .797 || 4.2 || 2.5 || 1.2 || .2 || 17.2
|-
| style="text-align:left;"| 2020–21
| style="text-align:left;"| Davidson
| 22 || 22 || 34.4 || .471 || .382 || .676 || 4.6 || 2.4 || .8 || .2 || 17.1
|-
| style="text-align:left;"| 2021–22
| style="text-align:left;"| Kentucky
| 34 || 34 || 32.9 || .446 || .415 || .744 || 2.1 || 1.3 || .8 || .1 || 11.4
|- class="sortbottom"
| style="text-align:center;" colspan="2"| Career
| 149 || 147 || 35.2 || .467 || .378 || .760 || 3.6 || 2.0 || .9 || .1 || 16.0

Personal life
Grady's grandmother, Sophia Williams-De Bruyn, is a South African activist famous for leading anti-apartheid marches. Grady launched the College Athletes for Respect and Equality initiative in 2020, to raise awareness of racial injustice.

References

External links
Kentucky Wildcats bio
Davidson Wildcats bio

1997 births
Living people
American men's basketball players
Basketball players from Boston
Catholic Memorial School alumni
Davidson Wildcats men's basketball players
Grand Rapids Gold players
Kentucky Wildcats men's basketball players
Shooting guards